Langxi South railway station is a railway station in Shizi, Langxi County, Xuancheng, Anhui, China. The station has two side platforms and two through tracks.

The station opened with the Hefei-Huzhou section of the Shangqiu–Hangzhou high-speed railway on 28 June 2020.

References 

Railway stations in Anhui
Railway stations in China opened in 2020